This is a list of vehicles in the collection of the Museum of Transport, Greater Manchester.

References 

Museums in Manchester
Lists of vehicles
History of transport in Greater Manchester